Así se baila (English title: That's How You Dance) is an American Spanish-language reality show that premiered on Telemundo on September 12, 2021. It is hosted by Jacqueline Bracamontes with the judging panel consisting of Adamari López, Cristián de la Fuente and Mariana Seoane.

Format 
The reality show revolves around 11 dance partnerships consisting of a known celebrity, accompanied by their significant other, family member or friend. They compete every week, in order to advance and eventually become the winning couple of the $200,000 prize.

Series overview

Participants

Ratings 
 
}}

References

2021 American television series debuts
2020s American reality television series
Telemundo original programming